Edwin Luther Sibert (March 2, 1897 – December 16, 1977) was a United States Army officer with the rank of major general and served as intelligence officer during World War II and post-war Europe, where he assisted in the creation of the Gehlen Organization. He would return to the United States and briefly serve in the Central Intelligence Group, the forerunner of the modern CIA. He was the son of Major General William L. Sibert and the brother of Major General Franklin C. Sibert. A graduate of the United States Military Academy in 1918, he would receive the Distinguished Service Medal three times for his service during World War II and the Cold War.

Early life and education

Sibert was born on March 2, 1897, in Little Rock, Arkansas, to Major General William L. Sibert and his wife Mary Margaret Cummings Sibert. He would be raised on military tradition, his grandfather William J. Sibert and great-uncle William B. Beeson having served in the Confederate army, and his father in the United States Army. Sibert's early years would see his father assigned to Manila, Philippines (1899–1900), and the Panama Canal Zone (1907–1914).

In 1914, Sibert would receive an at-large appointment to the United States Military Academy, graduating in 1918.

Career

Dates of rank

Service

Awards and decorations

Burial
Sibert is buried at Arlington National Cemetery along with his father MG William Luther Sibert.

References

External links
Generals of World War II

1897 births
1977 deaths
Military personnel from Little Rock, Arkansas
United States Army generals
United States Military Academy alumni
Recipients of the Distinguished Service Medal (US Army)
Recipients of the Legion of Merit
Honorary Commanders of the Order of the British Empire
Officiers of the Légion d'honneur
Recipients of the Croix de Guerre 1939–1945 (France)
Burials at Arlington National Cemetery
United States Army generals of World War II
American expatriates in Panama
American people in the American Philippines